Raúl Podestá (1899–1970) was an Argentine painter and sculptor.

Housing of Works

National
National Museum of Fine Arts
Museum of Fine Arts Boca
Ministry of War
Ministry of Education
City Council of the City of Buenos Aires
Home Colonial Chapel "Ricardo Gutiérrez", Marcos Paz, Buenos Aires
Church of the Savior
Maternal Asylum "Santa Rosa" of Buenos Aires
Cathedral in the City of Tandil
Church in the seaside resort of Costa del Este,

International
Church of St. Francis de Sales in Paris, France
Argentine Consulate in Florence .
Private collections in Argentina, Italy, France, Belgium, the Netherlands, England and the United States.

References

1899 births
1970 deaths
People from Buenos Aires
20th-century Argentine painters
Argentine male painters
20th-century Argentine sculptors
Male sculptors
20th-century Argentine male artists